The administrative divisions of China have consisted of several levels since ancient times, due to China's large population and geographical area. The constitution of China provides for three levels of government. However in practice, there are five levels of local government; the provincial (province, autonomous region, municipality, and special administrative region), prefecture, county, township, and village.

Since the 17th century, provincial boundaries in China have remained largely static. Major changes since then have been the reorganisation of provinces in the northeast after the establishment of the People's Republic of China and the formation of autonomous regions, based on Soviet ethnic policies. The provinces serve an important cultural role in China, as people tend to identify with their native province.

Levels
The Constitution of the People's Republic of China provides for three levels: the provincial, the county level, and the township level. However, in practice, there are four levels of government: the provincial, the prefectural level, the county level, and the township level. Rural villages and urban communities are sometimes considered as the fifth level, however they are by constitution “basic level autonomies” and there is no government on this level. , China administers 33 provincial-level regions, 334 prefecture-level divisions, 2,862 county-level divisions, 41,034 township-level administrations, and 704,382 basic level autonomies.

Each of the levels (except "special administrative regions") corresponds to a level in the Civil Service of the People's Republic of China.

Table

Summary
This table summarizes the divisions of the area administered by the People's Republic of China .

Provincial level (1st) 

 
The People's Republic of China (PRC) lays claims to 34 provincial-level divisions or first-level divisions, including 22 provinces, 5 autonomous regions, 4 municipalities, and 2 special administrative regions and 1 claimed province:

Provinces are theoretically subservient to the PRC central government, but in practice, provincial officials have large discretion with regard to economic policy. Unlike the United States, the power of the central government was (with the exception of the military) not exercised through a parallel set of institutions until the early 1990s. The actual practical power of the provinces has created what some economists call federalism with Chinese characteristics.

Most of the provinces, with the exception of the provinces in the northeast, have boundaries which were established long ago in the Yuan, Ming, and Qing dynasties. Sometimes provincial borders form cultural or geographical boundaries. This was an attempt by the imperial government to discourage separatism and warlordism through a divide and rule policy. Nevertheless, provinces have come to serve an important cultural role in China. People tend to be identified in terms of their native provinces, and each province has a stereotype that corresponds to their inhabitants.

The most recent administrative change have included the elevation of Hainan (1988) and Chongqing (1997) to provincial level status, and the creation of Hong Kong (1997) and Macau (1999) as Special administrative regions.

Provincial level governments vary in details of organization:

Provincial-level (1st) subdivisions

Prefectural level (2nd) 

Prefectural level divisions or second-level divisions are the second level of the administrative structure. Most provinces are divided into only prefecture-level cities and contain no other second level administrative units. Of the 22 provinces and 5 autonomous regions, only 3 provinces (Yunnan, Guizhou, Qinghai) and 1 autonomous region (Xinjiang) have more than three second-level or prefectural-level divisions that are not prefecture-level cities. As of June 2020, there were 339 prefectural level divisions:

County level (3rd) 

As of August 18, 2015, there were 2,852 county-level divisions:

Township level (4th)

Township-level (4th) subdivisions

Basic level autonomy (5th)

The basic level autonomy serves as an organizational division (census, mail system) and does not have much importance in political representative power. Basic local divisions like neighborhoods and communities are not informal like in America, but have defined boundaries and elected heads (one per area):

In urban areas, every subdistrict of a district of a city administers many communities or residential committees. Each of them has a residential committee to administer the dwellers of that neighborhood or community. Rural areas are organized into village committees or villager groups. A "village" in this case can either be a natural village, one that spontaneously and naturally exists, or a virtual village, which is a bureaucratic entity.

Village-level (5th) subdivisions

Special cases
Five cities formally on prefectural level have a special status in regard to planning and budget. They are separately listed in the five-year and annual state plans on the same level as provinces and national ministries, making them economically independent of their provincial government. These cities specifically designated in the state plan are
 Dalian (Liaoning)
 Ningbo (Zhejiang)
 Qingdao (Shandong)
 Shenzhen (Guangdong)
 Xiamen (Fujian)

In terms of budget authority, their governments have the de facto status of a province, but their legislative organs (National People's Congress and Chinese People's Political Consultative Conference) and other authorities not related to the economy are on the level of a prefecture and under the leadership of the province.

Some other large prefecture-level cities, known as sub-provincial cities, are half a level below a province. The mayors of these cities have the same rank as a vice governor of a province, and their district governments are half a rank higher than those of normal districts. The capitals of some provinces (seat of provincial government) are sub-provincial cities. In addition to the five cities specifically designated in the state plan, sub-provincial cities are:
 Harbin (Heilongjiang)
 Changchun (Jilin)
 Shenyang (Liaoning)
 Jinan (Shandong)
 Nanjing (Jiangsu)
 Hangzhou (Zhejiang)
 Guangzhou (Guangdong)
 Wuhan (Hubei)
 Chengdu (Sichuan)
 Xi'an (Shaanxi)

A similar case exists with some county-level cities. Some county-level cities are given more autonomy. These cities are known as sub-prefecture-level cities, meaning that they are given a level of power higher than a county, but still lower than a prefecture. Such cities are also half a level higher than what they would normally be. Sub-prefecture-level cities are often not put into any prefecture (i.e. they are directly administered by their province). Examples of sub-prefecture-level cities include Jiyuan (Henan province), Xiantao, Qianjiang and Tianmen (Hubei), Golmud (Qinghai), Manzhouli (Inner Mongolia), Shihanza, Tumushuk, Aral, and Wujiaqu (Xinjiang).

Some districts are also placed at half a level higher that what it should be. Examples are Pudong, Shanghai  and Binhai, Tianjin. Although its status as a  district of a municipality would define it as prefecture-level, the district head of Pudong is given sub-provincial powers. In other words, it is half a level higher than what it would normally be.

Special cases subdivisions

List

Ambiguity of the word "city" in China 
The Chinese word "" (shì) is usually loosely translated into English as "city". However, it has several different meanings due to the complexity of the administrative divisions used in China. Despite being urban or having urban centers, the SARs are almost never referred to as "Hong Kong City"/"Macau City" in contemporary Chinese and thus are not covered by the description below.

By its political level, when a "city" is referred to, it can be a:
 LV 1 (provincial-level):
 Municipality of China, literally "direct-controlled city" in Chinese, there being actually four: Beijing, Tianjin, Shanghai and Chongqing
 LV 2 (prefecture-level):
 Sub-provincial city, for example, Shenzhen in Guangdong Province
 Prefecture-level city, for example, Shijiazhuang, capital of Hebei Province
 LV 3 (county-level):
 Sub-prefecture-level city, for example, Jiyuan (directly under the administration of Henan Province)
 County-level city, for example, Yiwu (under the administration of the prefecture-level city of Jinhua)

By its actual area and population, it can be:
 Province-like, which is the municipality of Chongqing, a merger of 4 former prefectures and similar to the former Eastern-Sichuan province.
 Prefecture-like, which are the other three municipalities and almost all prefectural-level cities, usually 10–1,000 times larger than the urban center and a conglomeration of several counties and county-level cities. Some of them in sparsely populated areas like Hulunbuir are even larger than Chongqing but have a population comparable to that of prefectures.
 County-like, which is all sub-prefecture-level and some county-level cities, and several extremely simple prefecture-level cities (Jiayuguan, Xiamen, Haikou, etc).
 Not substantially larger than urban establishment: some county-level cities, plus some members of the previous category. However, country-level cities converted from counties are unlikely to belong here. Shanghai, despite being prefecture-like in size, belongs here due to its subway already extending beyond municipality limits. Some other economically prosperous prefecture-level cities are also provoking inter-prefecture urban integration, although they still possess (and never intend to eliminate) large swaths of rural area.

When used in the statistical data, the word "city" may have three different meanings:
 The area administrated by the city. For the municipality, the sub-provincial city, or the prefecture-level city, a "city" in this sense includes all of the counties, county-level cities, and city districts that the city governs. For the Sub-prefecture-level city or the County-level city, it includes all of the subdistricts, towns and townships that it has.
 The area comprising its urban city districts and suburb city districts. The difference between the urban district and the suburb districts is that an urban district comprises only the subdistricts, while a suburb district also has towns and townships to govern rural areas. In some sense, this definition is approximately the metropolitan area. This definition is not applied to the sub-prefecture-level city and the county-level city since they do not have city districts under them.
 Somewhat bizarrely, some districts such as Haidian District also possess towns. They have been treated clearly as urban districts for decades, but not from the inception, some areas are rural but other areas form an inseparable part of the central city.
 The urban area. For the municipality, the sub-provincial city, and the prefecture-level city, it comprises the urban city district and the adjacent subdistricts of the suburb city districts. For the sub-prefecture-level city and the county-level city, only central subdistricts are included. This definition is close to the strict meaning of "city" in western countries.

The choice of definition of "city" used for statistical data of Chinese cities can lead to different results.  For example, Shanghai is the largest city in China by population in the urban area but is smaller than Chongqing by the population within the administration area.

History 

Before the establishment of the Qin dynasty, China was ruled by a network of kings, nobles, and tribes. The rivalry of these groups culminated in the Warring States period, and the state of Qin eventually emerged dominant.

The Qin dynasty was determined not to allow China to fall back into disunity, and therefore designed the first hierarchical administrative divisions in China, based on two levels: jùn commanderies and xiàn counties. The Han dynasty that came immediately after added zhōu (usually translated as "provinces") as the third level on top, forming a three-tier structure.

The Sui and Tang dynasties abolished commanderies, and added circuits (dào, later lù under the Song and Jin) on top, maintaining a three-tier system that lasted through the 13th century. (As a second-level division, zhou are translated as "prefectures".) The Mongol-established Yuan dynasty introduced the modern precursors to provinces, bringing the number of levels to four. This system was then kept more or less intact until the Qing dynasty, the last imperial dynasty to rule China.

The Republic of China streamlined the levels to just provinces and counties in 1928 and made the first attempt to extend political administration beyond the county level by establishing townships below counties. This was also the system officially adopted by the People's Republic of China in 1949, which defined the administrative divisions of China as three levels: provinces, counties, and townships.

In practice, however, more levels were inserted. The ROC government soon learned that it was not feasible for a province to directly govern tens and sometimes hundreds of counties. Started from Jiangxi province in 1935, prefectures were later inserted between provinces and counties.  They continued to be ubiquitously applied by the PRC government to nearly all areas of China until the 1980s.  Since then, most of the prefectures were converted into prefecture-level cities.  Greater administrative areas were inserted on top of provinces by the PRC government, but they were soon abolished, in 1954.  District public offices were inserted between counties and townships; once ubiquitous as well, they are currently being abolished and very few remain.

The most recent major developments have been the establishment of Chongqing as a municipality and the creation of Hong Kong and Macau as special administrative regions.

Reform

In recent years there have been calls to reform the administrative divisions and levels of China. Rumours of an impending major reform have also spread through various online bulletin boards.

The district public offices is an ongoing reform to remove an extra level of administration from between the county and township levels. There have also been calls to abolish the prefecture-level, and some provinces have transferred some of the power prefectures currently hold to the counties they govern. There are also calls to reduce the size of the provinces. The ultimate goal is to reduce the different administration levels from five to three (Provincial level, County level, Village level), reducing the amount of corruption as well as the number of government workers, in order to lower the budget.

See also 

 Regions of China
 Metropolitan cities of China
 Secession in China
 Language Atlas of China
 Tiao-kuai
 New areas

References

External links 
 Ministry of Civil Affairs official website for administrative divisions
 Statistics
 Provincial, prefecture, and county maps 
 China's Regions and City Reports

 
 
China